The 167th Massachusetts General Court, consisting of the Massachusetts Senate and the Massachusetts House of Representatives, met in 1971 and 1972 during the governorship of Francis Sargent. Kevin B. Harrington served as president of the Senate and David M. Bartley served as speaker of the House.

Senators

Representatives

See also
 92nd United States Congress
 List of Massachusetts General Courts

References

Further reading

External links
 
 
 
 
 
 
  (1964-1994)

Political history of Massachusetts
Massachusetts legislative sessions
massachusetts
1971 in Massachusetts
massachusetts
1972 in Massachusetts